The Niwano Peace Prize is given to honor and encourage those devoting themselves to interreligious co-operation in the cause of peace and to make their achievements known. Its foundation hopes that the prize will further promote interreligious co-operation for peace and lead to the emergence of more people devoting themselves to this cause.

The award is given annually and consists of a certificate, a gold medal, and 20 million yen (roughly US$180,000). The screening committee, which decides the recipients, is made up of religious leaders of international stature. They select the recipient from candidates who are nominated by religious leaders and others of intellectual stature around the world.

The Tokyo-based Niwano Peace Foundation was initiated by the Japanese citizen Nikkyō Niwano, founder of the Buddhist lay organization Risshō Kōsei Kai; he was one of the few non-Christian observers of the Second Vatican Council. His son, Nichiko Niwano, is his successor as chairman of the movement, which is dedicated to interreligious dialogue.

Laureates 
1983: Dom Hélder Câmara, Brazil
1984: Homer A. Jack, USA 
1985: Zhao Puchu, China 
1986: Philip A. Potter, Dominica 
1987: World Muslim Congress, Pakistan 
1988: not awarded 
1989: Etai Yamada, Japan 
1990: Norman Cousins, USA 
1991: Dr. Hildegard Goss-Mayr, Austria 
1992: A. T. Ariyaratne, Sri Lanka 
1993: Neve Shalom/Wahat al-Salam, Israel 
1994: Cardinal Paulo Evaristo Arns, Archbishop of Sao Paulo, Brazil 
1995: M. Aram, India 
1996: Marii Hasegawa, USA 
1997: Corrymeela Community, Northern Ireland 
1998: Maha Ghosananda, Cambodia 
1999: Community of Sant'Egidio, Italy 
2000: Dr. Kang Won Yong, Korea 
2001: Elias Chacour, bishop of the Melkite-Catholic Church in Israel 
2002: Samuel Ruiz García, Bishop Emeritus of San Cristobal de las Casas, Mexico 
2003: Dr. Scilla Elworthy, UK
2004: Acholi Religious Leaders Peace Initiative (ARLPI), Uganda 
2005: Dr. Hans Küng, Switzerland 
2006: Rabbis for Human Rights, Israël 
2007: Master Cheng Yen, founder of Tzu-Chi, the Buddhist Compassion Relief Tzu-Chi Foundation, Taiwan 
2008: Prince El Hassan bin Talal, Jordan 
2009: Reverend Canon Gideon Byamugisha, Uganda 
2010: Ela Bhatt, India 
2011: Sulak Sivaraksa, Thailand 
2012: Rosalina Tuyuc, Guatemala 
2013: Gunnar Stålsett, Norway
2014: Dena Merriam, USA
2015: Pastor Esther Ibanga, Nigeria
2016: Center for Peace Building and Reconciliation (CPBR), Sri Lanka
2017: Munib Younan, Palestine
2018: Adyan Foundation, Lebanon
2019: John Paul Lederach, USA
2020: Ven. Pomnyun Sunim, South Korea
2021: Venerable , Taiwan

References

External links 
 Niwano Peace Prize

Peace awards
Japanese awards